Emma Asson (13 July 1889 – 1 January 1965), was an Estonian politician (Social Democrat). She was the first woman to be elected to the Estonian parliament. Asson participated in the creation of the first constitution of the independent Estonia, particularly within the fields of education and gender equality. She also wrote the some of the first history textbook in the Estonian language in 1912.

Biography
Emma Asson was born in Vaabina Parish, Võru County, Governorate of Livonia, part of the Russian Empire, as the daughter of a teacher. She studied at the A. S. Pushkin Girls' School in Tartu and graduated in history at the Bestuzhev Courses in Saint Petersburg in Russia in 1910. She was then employed as a history teacher at a girls' college in Tartu.

Emma Asson was active in different women's organisations for social and education issues. In 1919, she was elected to the Tallinn city council as well as to the first national parliament of the independent Estonia for the social democrats. She was the first woman. In 1920, the women of Estonia were given full political rights under a new constitution. Two women were consulted over this constitution, and they were Minni Kurs-Olesk and Asson. She was a member of the Education Ministry in 1919–21, secretary for the Estonian Women's Association and Head of the Education Department in 1925–1940.

She was married to the politician Ferdinand Petersen from 1921 to 1941.

Sources

1889 births
1965 deaths
People from Antsla Parish
People from Kreis Werro
Estonian Social Democratic Workers' Party politicians
Members of the Estonian Constituent Assembly
Members of the Riigikogu, 1920–1923
20th-century Estonian women politicians
Women members of the Riigikogu
University of Tartu alumni